Chaste Susanne is a 1926 German silent comedy film directed by Richard Eichberg and starring Lilian Harvey, Willy Fritsch and Ruth Weyher. It is based on the 1910 operetta Die keusche Susanne composed by Jean Gilbert with a libretto by Georg Okonkowski.  In Britain it was released under the alternative title The Girl in the Taxi in reference to The Girl in the Taxi in the English version of the operetta. The film's art direction is by Jacek Rotmil. It was filmed at the Johannisthal Studios in Berlin.

It marked the first pairing of Harvey and Fritsch who went on to become the leading screen couple in Weimar and early Nazi cinema. The film premiered at the UFA-Palast am Zoo and was a smash hit on its release.

Cast
 Lilian Harvey as Jacqueline
 Willy Fritsch as René Boislurette
 Ruth Weyher as Susanne
 Otto Wallburg as Charency
 Hans Junkermann as Baron Aubrais
 Lydia Potechina as Baronin Aubrais
 Sascha Bragowa as Charencys Frau Rose
 Werner Fuetterer as Hubert
 Hans Wassmann as Dr. med. Pomarel
 Ernst Hofmann as Henry, Renés Freund
 Wilhelm Bendow
 Albert Paulig

References

Bibliography

External links

1926 films
1926 comedy films
Films of the Weimar Republic
German silent feature films
German comedy films
Films directed by Richard Eichberg
Films set in Berlin
Films based on operettas
UFA GmbH films
German black-and-white films
Films shot at Johannisthal Studios
Silent comedy films
1920s German films
1920s German-language films